Kelvyn Ramos da Fonseca (born 7 May 1999), simply known as Kelvyn, is a Brazilian footballer who currently plays for Ferroviária, on loan from Ceará. Mainly a left back, he can also play as a defensive midfielder.

Club career
Born in Osasco, São Paulo, Kelvyn joined Internacional after a trial period in 2016, but was subsequently loaned to SER Santa Rosa before joining Atlético Tubarão's under-20 squad. He made his debut for the latter's first team on 30 September 2018, starting in a 5–1 Copa Santa Catarina home routing of Operário de Mafra.

In 2019, Kelvyn joined Ceará on loan, initially for their under-20 squad. On 29 April 2020, after appearing with the main squad, he signed a permanent contract until December 2021.

Kelvyn made his Série A debut on 4 October 2020, by coming on as a second-half substitute for Alyson in a 1–2 away loss against Palmeiras. His first goal in the category came on 14 November, as he scored his team's first in a 2–4 loss at Grêmio.

Career statistics

Honours
Ceará
Copa do Nordeste: 2020

References

External links
Ceará profile 

1999 births
Living people
People from Osasco
Brazilian footballers
Association football defenders
Campeonato Brasileiro Série A players
Clube Atlético Tubarão players
Ceará Sporting Club players
Associação Ferroviária de Esportes players
Footballers from São Paulo (state)